Tegeticula mexicana is a moth of the family Prodoxidae. It is found in the United States  in Texas, New Mexico and in Mexico (including Coahuila). The habitat consists of desert flats and low slopes in the Chihuahuan Desert and open shrubland and grassland in coastal regions.

The wingspan is 19.5-29.5 mm. The forewings are white and the hindwings are brownish gray.

The larvae feed on Yucca treculeana and Yucca torreyi. They feed on developing seeds. Pupation takes place in a cocoon in the soil.

References

Moths described in 1962
Prodoxidae